Analysis & Policy Observatory (more commonly known as APO) is a not-for-profit open access repository or digital library, specialising in public policy grey literature, mainly from Australia and New Zealand, with some coverage of other countries. Formerly known as Australian Policy Online, the organisation underwent a name change to Analysis & Policy Observatory (APO) in 2017.

Background 
APO was established in 2002 at, and continues to be hosted by, Swinburne University of Technology in Melbourne. It was intended as a way to collate and disseminate academic research reports and other grey literature that was increasingly proliferating online. It has since established itself as a notable resource for people involved in policy research in Australia and New Zealand. APO is a not-for-profit organisation supported by partnerships with academic institutions and government agencies, research grants and advertising and services revenue. APO's major partner is ANZSOG and it has also been awarded a number of Australian Research Council grants.

Purpose 
APO was established to address the transformation of production for publications brought about by the internet. Frustrations with the limitations of the academic publishing system – long delays, lack of access or a limited audience – were causing producers of academic and other content to move online and increasingly produce grey literature (informally published material, such as reports, that may be difficult to trace via conventional channels). The informal channels used to disseminate digital grey literature have meant that libraries and other services have only been able to collect it in an ad hoc manner. APO aims to make digital research content that is relevant to Australian policy debates more easily accessible and usable to promote more evidence-informed decision-making.

Activities 
APO specialises in cataloguing grey literature on public policy from academic research centres, think tanks, government and non-government organisations. As well as research, the site includes a smaller collection of opinion and commentary pieces, video, audio and web resources focused on policy issues. APO's open access digital repository is searchable and APO provides a free email newsletter service that notifies subscribers of the latest additions to the repository.

References

External links 
 

Open-access archives
Organisations based in Melbourne
Social sciences literature
2002 establishments in Australia